Perry is an unincorporated community in Hardy County, West Virginia, United States. Perry lies in the Trout Run Valley of eastern Hardy County.

References

Unincorporated communities in Hardy County, West Virginia
Unincorporated communities in West Virginia